Gold Dust is a twice-yearly literary arts magazine, founded by Omma Velada in 2004, which publishes poetry, short fiction, artwork, short stories, poetry and play collections, organises literary competitions and runs live events consisting of poetry and prose readings, drama performances and live music. Its headquarters are in London. There is both a free online edition and a printed edition of each issue of the magazine. The publication is listed in the annual Writers and Artists Yearbook.

References

External links
Gold Dust web site
Gold Dust on Duotrope's Digest
Good Reads review of Gold Dust short story collection

2004 establishments in the United Kingdom
Biannual magazines published in the United Kingdom
Literary magazines published in the United Kingdom
Cultural magazines published in the United Kingdom
Magazines published in London
Magazines established in 2004
Poetry literary magazines